Andrei Kuchumov is a Russian rugby league footballer who played for the  Moscow Magicians  and represented Russia national rugby league team in the 2000 World Cup. Kuchumov played in one match from the bench.

References

Living people
Russian rugby league players
Russia national rugby league team players
Year of birth missing (living people)
Place of birth missing (living people)